Kayar (English: Coir) is a 1978 Malayalam epic novel written by Thakazhi Sivasankara Pillai. Widely considered one of the most seminal works in Malayalam literature, Kayar received many major literary awards, including the Vayalar Award.

Plot summary
Set in Kuttanad, the novel traces the evolution of the central Travancore society from the early 19th century to the mid-twentieth century. It covers more than two centuries of Kerala life, encompassing six generations of characters. The historic transformation of man's relationship with land, as also between man and man, men and women and even man and God, forms the staple theme of Kayar.

Background
The idea of a novel which contains the vignettes of social life in Kerala stayed in the author's mind for many years. "Two hundred and fifty years of Kerala life flowed past my mind's eye. But I needed a form. I could find no help from the Western classics," Thakazhi reminisces. For years he carried the "germ" inside his head. One night, as he lay sleepless in bed, the Mahabharata epic with its episodic structure drifted into his mind as a possibility. The next day he started work on Kayar. It took him three years to complete the book.

Translations
 Coir: English translation by N. Sreekantan Nair; Sahitya Akademi; 1998
 Kayiru: Tamil translation by C.A. Balan; Sahitya Akademi; 2003
 Hagga: Kannada translation by K.K. Nair and Ashok Kumar; Sahitya Akademi; 2007
 Rassi (1995), Hindi translation by Sudhanshu Chaturvedi. For this, Chaturvedi has won Sahitya Akademi Award for translation.

Adaptations
Bhayanakam (2018), directed by Jayaraj.

Awards
 1980: Vayalar Award

References

External links
 Kayar at DC Books official website
 Review of the English translation by M. Mukundan (India Today)
Review of the Tamil translation by Neela Padmanabhan (The Hindu)
 Review of the Kannada translation by V. Gopalakrishna (The Hindu)

1978 novels
Malayalam novels
Epic novels
Novels set in Kerala
Novels by Thakazhi Sivasankara Pillai
DC Books books
Indian novels adapted into films
1978 Indian novels
Jnanpith Award-winning works